Richard James Foster (born 1942) is a Christian theologian and author in the Quaker tradition.  His writings speak to a broad Christian audience. Born in 1942 in New Mexico, Foster has been a professor at Friends University and pastor of Evangelical Friends churches. Foster resides in Denver, Colorado. He earned his undergraduate degree at George Fox University in Oregon and his Doctor of Pastoral Theology at Fuller Theological Seminary, and received an honorary doctorate from Houghton College.

Foster is best known for his 1978 book Celebration of Discipline, which examines the inward disciplines of prayer, fasting, meditation, and study in the Christian life, the outward disciplines of simplicity, solitude, submission, and service, and the corporate disciplines  of confession, worship, guidance, and celebration.  It has sold over one million copies.  It was named by Christianity Today as one of the top ten books of the twentieth century. A work described as a sequel to Celebration is Foster's 1985 Money, Sex & Power. and associated study guide.

He also published Freedom of Simplicity in 1981, which further explores the discipline of simple, intentional living. Prayer: Finding the Heart's True Home (1992), which explores 21 different types of Christian prayer, edited Devotional Classics (1993), a devotional guide featuring Christian wisdom through the ages, and  Streams of Living Water (2001), which examines the place of the different spiritual traditions - Contemplative: The Prayer-Filled Life; Holiness: The Virtuous Life ; Charismatic: The Spirit-Empowered Life; Social Justice: The Compassionate Life; Evangelical: The Word-Centered Life; and Incarnational: The Sacramental Life - in Christianity.

Foster (along with several others) also wrote the devotional Renovaré Spiritual Formation Bible (now published as The Life with God Study Bible). Two editions of this NRSV-based study Bible exist, one with the apocryphal/deuterocanonical texts and one without.

In 2008, he co-authored with Gayle Beebe, the book Longing for God.

In 1988 Foster founded Renovaré, a Christian renewal para-Church organization.

In recent years he has allowed his hair to grow, wearing it in a long pony tail.  He says this is his way of honoring the portion of his heritage which is Ojibwe.

References

External links
 

20th-century Christian mystics
20th-century Quakers
21st-century Christian mystics
21st-century Quakers
American Christian mystics
American evangelicals
American Quakers
American religious writers
American spiritual writers
American theologians
Evangelical writers
Friends University people
Fuller Theological Seminary alumni
George Fox University alumni
Protestant mystics
Quaker evangelicals
Quaker ministers
Quaker theologians
Quaker writers
Living people
1942 births